FP1 may refer to:
 Fairphone 1
 Fp1: an EEG electrode site according to the 10-20 system
 F.P.1, a fictitious seadrome in a German science-fiction novel and the 1932 film based on it